William Green (1817 – 25 November 1870) was an English cricketer who made two first-class cricket appearances for Kent representative teams just before the initial formation of the first Kent County Cricket Club in 1842. He was born at Sevenoaks in Kent in 1817.

Green's two first-class matches were against an England team at Bromley in 1841, and Sussex at the Beverley Ground in Canterbury in 1842. He ran The Crown public house at Milton-next-Gravesend and died at Gravesend in November 1870.

References

External links

1817 births
1870 deaths
People from Sevenoaks
English cricketers
Kent cricketers
People from Milton, Kent